Krishnaraja Wadiyar III (14 July 1794 – 27 March 1868) was the twenty-second maharaja of the Kingdom of Mysore. Also known as Mummadi Krishnaraja Wadiyar, the maharaja belonged to the Wadiyar dynasty and ruled the kingdom for nearly seventy years, from 30 June 1799 to 27 March 1868. He is known for his contribution and patronage to different arts and music during his reign. He was succeeded by his adopted son, Chamarajendra Wadiyar X.

Early years

Krishnaraja Wadiyar III, who was born at Srirangapatna, was the son of Khasa Chamaraja Wadiyar IX (who was born at Arikottara, now Chamarajanagar) and his first wife, Maharani Kempananjammani Avaru. Maharani Lakshmi Ammani Devi, his adoptive grandmother, played a major role in the education and upbringing of her adopted grandson, Krishnaraja Wadiyar III, and was instrumental in his ascendancy to the Mysore throne.

Maharani Lakshmi Ammani Devi was awaiting a chance to unseat Hyder Ali (who died) and later his son Tipu Sultan, and had sent numerous feelers to the British to unseat him and hand over the kingdom to the Wadiyars. She also informed the British about the treaty between Tipu Sultan and the French. When Tipu Sultan died at the hands of the British in 1799, she discussed about the handover of the Mysore throne, which finally led to the installation of the five-year-old Krishnaraja Wadiyar III, as the Maharaja of Mysore on 30 June 1799.

The ceremony took place in a special pavilion constructed near the Lakshmiramana Swamy temple in Mysore. Being led to it by Sir Arthur Wellesley on his right, Tipu Sultan's prime minister Dewan Purnaiah was formally selected as the Dewan of Mysore with an indication that he should be loyal to the king till the king himself attains an age of discretion.

Ruler of Mysore State
Krishnaraja Wadiyar III attained the age of 16 in early 1810 and hence attained the age of discretion. After discussing with the British Resident, A. H. Cole, the reins of the state were transferred from Dewan Purnaiah to the king. But the king lost the services of his grandmother, who died in 1810, and also of Purnaiah, who died in 1812.

The years that followed witnessed cordial relations between Mysore and the British until things began to sour in the 1820s. Even though the Governor of Madras, Thomas Munro, determined after a personal investigation in 1825 that there was no substance to the allegations of financial impropriety made by A. H. Cole, the incumbent Resident of Mysore, the civil insurrection (commonly known as Nagar revolt) which broke out towards the end of the decade changed things considerably. In 1831, close on the heels of the insurrection and citing maladministration, the British took direct control of the princely state. For the next fifty years, Mysore passed under the rule of successive British Commissioners; Lieutenant-General Mark Cubbon, renowned for his statesmanship, served from 1834 until 1861 and put into place an efficient and successful administrative system which left Mysore a well-developed state.

Contribution to culture
Krishnaraja Wadiyar III was responsible for the cultural growth of the Kingdom of Mysore. He was himself a writer, having written Kannada books like Sritattvanidhi and Sougandhikaparinaya. He also has a number of writers in his court who together contributed to the development of modern Kannada prose, which had a style different from the Champu style of prose which was followed till then. Other important writings that emerged during his rule include Mudramanjusha by Kempu Narayana, Kalavati Parinaya by Yadava, and Vachana Kadamabari. The king was well versed in many languages, including Sanskrit, Kannada, Tamil, English, Telugu, and Urdu. He even played the musical instrument, veena. He was an expert player of board games and is credited to have revived the Ganjifa game. He was also a collector and an inventor of board games.

Krishnaraja Wadiyar III was a ruler who gave a lot of importance to the development of art during his period. He patronised many scholars in his court and he himself was a great Kannada and Sanskrit Scholar, and has composed more than 50 works. The Yakshagana form of literature, its growth, and survival are all due to his efforts. Parti Subba from South Canara, a famous Yakshagana writer, flourished during his period. Devachandra, Venkatarama Shastri, Basavappa Shastri, Aliya Lingaraja, Kempu Narayana, Srinivasa Kavisarvabhouma, Thammaya Kavi, Nanjunda Kavi, Shantaraja Pandita were all patronised by him.

Devachandra wrote Rajavali Katha which is of great historical importance and also Ramakathavathara, a work in Champu style. Kempu Narayana wrote Mudra Manjusha, which is a Kannada prose. Asthana Vidwan Basavappa Shastri has written various works. He composed Kannada poems such as Shakuntala, Vikramorvasiya, Rathnavali, Chandakousika, and Uttara Ramacharita. He has also translated the famous work of Shakespeare, Othello, into Kannada and it is known as Shurasena Charita. He has also written Damayanti in Champu style, Savitri Charita in Shatpadi, Sri Raghavendra Swamy Ashtottara Stotram, and numerous other works in Sanskrit.

Krishnaraja Wadiyar III has composed many works like Dasharatha Nandana Charita, Grahana Darpana, Sankya Ratna Kosha, Chaturanga Sara Sarvasva, Sri Tatvanidhi, Saugandhika Parinaya, Sri Krishna Katha Sangraha, Ramayana, Mahabharata, Surya Chandra Vamsavali, etc. He was called Bhoja Raja of Kannada. The Wadiyar's Surya Chandra Vamsavali narrates a hundred episodes from the Ramyana and the Mahabharata, and the adventures of Yaduraya and Krishnaraya, the founders of the Wadiyar Dynasty.

Krishnaraja Wodeyar III also sponsored a number of art pieces and invited a large number of artists to the royal workshop, where a number of ambitious projects including murals and illustrated manuscripts were commissioned. These included illustrated volumes of the Bhagavata Purana and a splendid Ramayana featuring Rama shooting a flaming arrow exploding on the page.

See also

 Mummadi

Notes

References

External links

 Game Pandit
 The Origins of Chess
 History of Magic Knight's Tours
 Games of yore
 New Light on Yoga
 In-Door Games in Karnataka’s Heritage
 Cards of Honour

1794 births
1868 deaths
Kings of Mysore
Krishnaraja III
19th-century Indian poets
Knights Grand Commander of the Order of the Star of India
Hindu monarchs
Indian male poets
19th-century Indian royalty
Poets from Karnataka